

 is an Apollo near-Earth object roughly  in diameter. On 2 January 2020 it passed  from Earth.

Discovery 
 came to perihelion (closest approach to the Sun) on 24 December 2020. On 2 January 2020 it passed  from Earth. Being such a small and faint asteroid with the bright glare of the waxing gibbous moon in the sky, it was only observed for 1 day. The Earth approach increased the asteroid's orbital period by roughly 21 days.

2022 
The asteroid came to perihelion around 25 December 2021. The poorly constrained orbit has the asteroid passing  from Earth on 7 January 2022 with an uncertainty region of about ±2.5 million km extending over ±8 days.

It is not listed on the more thorough Sentry Risk Table because Sentry accounts for orbit propagation nonlinearities along the line of variations and the nonlinearities do not intersect where Earth will be.

See also 
 2018 AH – Short arc object approaching in December 2021
  – Short arc object possibly approaching in May 2022

References

External links 
 List Of Apollo Minor Planets (by designation), Minor Planet Center
 
 
 

Minor planet object articles (unnumbered)
Discoveries by MLS
20200104
20220107
2020104